Manzonia wilmae is a species of minute sea snail, a marine gastropod mollusk or micromollusk in the family Rissoidae.

Description

Distribution

References

wilmae
Molluscs of the Atlantic Ocean
Molluscs of the Canary Islands
Gastropods described in 1987